Galápagos is a municipality located in the province of Guadalajara, Spain. Its Postal Code is 19174.

References

External links

 Galápagos Town Hall

Municipalities in the Province of Guadalajara